Andurma is a village and municipality in the Lerik Rayon of Azerbaijan. It has a population of 577. The municipality consists of the villages of Andurma and Piyəküçə.

References 

Populated places in Lerik District